Just One Look may refer to:

 "Just One Look" (song), a 1963 song by Doris Troy
 Just One Look (EP), a 1964 EP by The Hollies, includes a cover version of the above song
 Just One Look (film), a 2002 Hong Kong film
 Just One Look (novel), a 2004 novel by Harlan Coben